Maraveh Tappeh (also Romanized as Maravehtepe, Marveh Tappeh, and Morāveh Tappeh; also known as Maraveh (also Romanized as Marāveh) is a city and capital of Maraveh Tappeh County in Golestan Province, in northern Iran.  At the 2006 census, its population was 5,602, in 1,147 families.

The town was fully Turkmen in its ethnic composition and Hanafi Sunni Muslim in its religion. But as of late, it has been settled by a growing number of Khurasani Kurds of Shia Islamic religious persuasion. Consequently, the town now has a mixed ethnic and religious population of Sunni Turkmens and Shia Kurds.

References

Populated places in Maraveh Tappeh County

Cities in Golestan Province